The Dark Universe Observatory  (DUO)  is a planned NASA space-based telescope. It will conduct observations of galaxy clusters on the X-ray range with the intent of finding data related to both dark matter and energy.

References
 

Space telescopes
Satellites of the United States
Proposed satellites